Stephen Lack (born January 1, 1946) is a Canadian artist and former actor and screenwriter best known for his leading role in David Cronenberg's Scanners and Allan Moyle's The Rubber Gun, for which he was nominated for two Genie Awards.

Early life and education
Lack was born in 1946 in Montreal, Quebec, Canada, and gained a Bachelor of Arts in Psychology from McGill University in 1967, followed by a Master of Fine Arts in Sculpture at Universidad de Guanajuato, San Miguel de Allende, Mexico, in 1969.

Career
Although he also produces drawings and sculpture, his primary medium is painting; he specializes in American scenes (urban, cultural, and landscapes) in a style that has been described as Neo-Expressionist. His art has won a number of awards and residencies.

He was artist in residence at Ancienne Manufacture Royale, Limoges, and Banff Institute of the Arts in 1988, Ford Motor Company, Dearborn, Michigan in 1989, and Connecticut College and Skidmore College in 1999. He received awards in the "Painting" category from the National Endowment for the Arts in 1987 and 1993, and the Canada Council for the Arts in 1991. In 2018 Xeno-Optic with the assistance of the Research Services office at St. Thomas University in Canada published a 136-page text on the drawings of Stephen Lack titled There is a War, with an essay by Virgil Hammock, and a foreword by Ronald Edsforth. The text reflects Stephen Lack's ability to see the world dominated by American conflicts as Goya saw his world in his work The Disasters of War, or Jacques Callot's Les Grandes Misères de la guerre (The Great Miseries of War).

The best-known films in which he appeared are Scanners in 1981 and Dead Ringers in 1988, but he has also appeared in cameo roles and independent films. Credits include Montreal Main (1974), The Rubber Gun (1978, which he also co-wrote with Allan Moyle, winning Genie Awards for both Performance and Screenplay), Head On (aka Deadly Passion, 1980); Perfect Strangers (1984), and All the Vermeers in New York (1990).

Personal life
He lives and works in New York, and is the father of Asher Lack, front-man of the band Ravens & Chimes.

Filmography 

 Montreal Main (1974; also writer) – Steve
 The Angel and the Woman (1977) – Boss
 The Rubber Gun (1977; also writer) – Steve
 Head On (1980) – Peter Hill
 Scanners (1981) – Cameron Vale
 A 20th Century Chocolate Cake (1984)
 Perfect Strangers (1984) – Lt. Burns
 Dead Ringers (1988) – Anders Wolleck
 All the Vermeers in New York (1990) – Mark
 Ernstfall in Havanna (2002)

Awards and nominations 

 1980 Genie Award for Best Performance by an Actor in a Leading Role: The Rubber Gun (nominated)
 1980 Genie Award for Best Screenplay: The Rubber Gun (nominated)

References

External links

Arts & Minds, bravo.ca 
Video profile, akamai.com
Journal of Contemporary Art, NYC, 1988

1946 births
Living people
20th-century Canadian painters
Canadian male painters
21st-century Canadian painters
Canadian male film actors
Male actors from Montreal
McGill University Faculty of Science alumni
Postmodern artists
20th-century Canadian male actors
21st-century Canadian male actors
Canadian male screenwriters
Writers from Montreal
Artists from Montreal
Canadian expatriates in the United States
20th-century Canadian male artists
21st-century Canadian male artists
20th-century Canadian screenwriters
20th-century Canadian male writers